Harebell Lake is a lake in geographic Speight Township in the Unorganized West Part of Timiskaming District in northeastern Ontario, Canada.

The lake has one unnamed inflow, at the southwest. The primary outflow is an unnamed creek at the northeast which flows to McKenzie Lake and onward, flowing subsequently via Spray Creek, Spring Creek, the Montreal River and the Ottawa River to the Saint Lawrence River.

See also
List of lakes in Ontario

References

Lakes of Timiskaming District